"K.I.S.S.I.N.G." is a 1988 single by singer/songwriter Siedah Garrett, taken from her album Kiss of Life.  The single was her most successful release as a solo artist, hitting number one on the dance chart for one week.  On the soul chart, "K.I.S.S.I.N.G." peaked at number sixteen and on the Billboard Hot 100, it went to number ninety-seven.

Track listing
7" Single / Cassette Single
 "K.I.S.S.I.N.G." – 4:05
 "Taboo" – 3:28

12" Single
 "K.I.S.S.I.N.G. (Heat Of Passions Mix)" – 8:14 
 "K.I.S.S.I.N.G. (Dub)" – 8:30 
 "K.I.S.S.I.N.G. (Acid Bass Line Edit)" – 7:30 
 "K.I.S.S.I.N.G. (A Cappella)" – 4:20

CD Single
 "K.I.S.S.I.N.G. (The Heat Of Passion Mix)" – 8:16 
 "K.I.S.S.I.N.G. (Dub)" – 8:36 
 "Taboo" – 3:27

Personnel
Credits are adapted from the parent album's liner notes.
 Siedah Garrett – lead and background vocals
 Guy Babylon – arrangement, synths programming and performance
 Jerry Hey – arrangement, trumpet and flugelhorn
 Rod Temperton – arrangement
 Larry "Larr-Dog" Williams – synths programming and performance, and saxophone
 Paul "P.J." Jackson, Jr. – guitar
 Daniel Higgins – saxophone
 Gary Grant – trumpet and flugelhorn
 Amber Merino – little girl

Charts

References

External links
 

1988 singles
Music videos directed by Mary Lambert
1988 songs